Vencie Leonard Glenn (born October 26, 1964) is a former American football safety in the National Football League. He was drafted by the New England Patriots in the second round of the 1986 NFL Draft. He starred in college football at Indiana State.   He was a two-year starter at Kennedy High in Silver Spring, Maryland.

College career
Glenn had a stellar career at Indiana State; a two-time All-Conference safety, he was awarded the 1985 Missouri Valley Conference "Player of the Year (Defense)" and was named All-American by the AFCA.  A ball-hawking safety, he still holds the ISU record for career interceptions (17), notching 2 vs. #6 Eastern Illinois in the 1983 playoffs.

In 1984, he was 4th in the Missouri Valley Conference in Interceptions (6) and 2nd in Interception Return Yardage (126).

He participated in the 1986 Senior Bowl and was invited to the Blue–Gray Football Classic.

NFL career
Glenn also played for the San Diego Chargers, New Orleans Saints, Minnesota Vikings, and New York Giants.

Glenn intercepted 35 passes during his career; he ranks #25 on the San Diego Chargers career interceptions list (12 INTs); he is currently tied at #18 (14 INTs) on the Minnesota Vikings career interceptions list. This return is the third-longest in NFL history; it was the longest ever at the time until Ed Reed broke the record in 2004 and again in 2008.

He led the NFL in 'Interception Return Yardage' in 1987 with 166 yards.

References

1964 births
Living people
American football cornerbacks
American football safeties
Indiana State Sycamores football players
Minnesota Vikings players
New England Patriots players
New Orleans Saints players
New York Giants players
San Diego Chargers players
Players of American football from Louisiana